Caracol Internacional is the international signal of Colombia's Caracol TV. It offers general programming aimed to Colombians abroad, mostly consisting of old Caracol TV telenovelas, series, and entertainment shows. It also simulcasts Noticias Caracol, El radar, and breakfast television show Día a día with Colombia's Caracol TV, as well as Venezuela's RCTV flagship newscast El Observador.

Gallery

External links
 Official website

Caracol Televisión
Television networks in Colombia
Television channels and stations established in 2002
Television stations in Colombia
Latin American cable television networks
Spanish-language television stations
2002 establishments in Colombia